Alishar (also Romanized as ‘Alīshār and ‘Alī Shār) is a village in Kharqan District, Zarandieh County, Markazi Province, Iran. At the 2006 census, its population was 1,487, in 401 families.

The 14th-century author Hamdallah Mustawfi listed Alishar as one of the main villages in the district of Kharraqan.

References 

Populated places in Zarandieh County